Texas Motor Speedway is a speedway located in the northernmost portion of the U.S. city of Fort Worth, Texas – the portion located in Denton County, Texas. The reconfigured track measures  with banked 20° in turns 1 and 2 and banked 24° in turns 3 and 4. Texas Motor Speedway is a quad-oval design, where the front straightaway juts outward slightly. The track layout is similar to Atlanta Motor Speedway and Charlotte Motor Speedway. The track is owned by Speedway Motorsports, Inc. Nicknamed “The Great American Speedway“ the racetrack facility is one of the largest motorsports venues in the world capable of hosting crowds in excess of 200,000 spectators.

History

The speedway has been managed since its inception by racing promoter Eddie Gossage until June 2021 when he stepped down from the position of track president, citing retirement from motorsports management.

However, as the tracks' respective racing surfaces continue to wear, qualifying speeds at Atlanta have become consistently faster than at Texas (2005 and 2006). Brian Vickers holds the NASCAR qualifying record at TMS. In 2006, he posted a  speed. Elliott Sadler beat the record before Brian, qualifying in the 49/50th spot. Being the last person out on the track, Brian nipped Elliott Sadler's qualifying time. The NASCAR records still fall short of the all-time TMS qualifying record though. Driving a Lola Ford Champ Car, Kenny Brack took pole for the aborted Firestone Firehawk 600, with an average speed of 233.447 mph in 2001.

Two racetracks formerly on the Winston Cup schedule were closed to make room for Texas Motor Speedway's two race dates, with the North Wilkesboro Speedway being bought by TMS owner Bruton Smith and New Hampshire International Speedway owner Bob Bahre. The track was closed with one of the track's two dates going to both new owners. The North Carolina Speedway in Rockingham, North Carolina was also sold to Smith as a result of the Ferko lawsuit with the track's one remaining date also being handed over to Texas.

Texas Motor Speedway is home to the Cup Series' Autotrader EchoPark Automotive 500, and from 2021-2022 was home to the exhibition NASCAR All-Star Race. The track also hosts two NASCAR Xfinity Series races, the Alsco Uniforms 250 and the Andy's Frozen Custard 335, the IndyCar Series' Genesys 600, and the NASCAR Camping World Truck Series' SpeedyCash.com 220.

For a short time during construction in September 1996, the track's name was changed to Texas International Raceway. SMI's customary track naming convention had planned to have the "Motor Speedway" as part of the name. However, in August 1996, a small quarter-mile dirt raceway in Alvin, Texas (now known as Texas Thunder Speedway) had filed suit to use the name. On December 2, 1996, a settlement between the two tracks saw the "Texas Motor Speedway" name reinstated to the  oval, and the small number of Texas International Raceway merchandise instantly became collectible.

Between 2001 and 2002, the track, after the reconfiguration in 1998, was repaved because of a hole in turn three. On August 17, 2010, a press conference was held and it was announced that TMS's spring race will become a Saturday night event in 2011. The Samsung Mobile 500 was held on Saturday April 9, 2011. The same year, the apron of the speedway was repaved.

Jeff Burton (1997) and Dale Earnhardt Jr. (2000) both earned their first Cup win at Texas Motor Speedway. Earnhardt's victory was a then-record for fewest races to notch a victory in the "modern era" on the Cup circuit, winning in just his 12th start, breaking the record held by his father, Dale Earnhardt (16 starts). (The record has since been broken three times, by Kevin Harvick (3 starts), Jamie McMurray (2 starts) and Trevor Bayne (2 starts).

On October 13, 2000, Tony Roper was racing in the Craftsman Truck Series O'Reilly 400 at Texas Motor Speedway when he attempted to pass Steve Grissom. However, another truck veered up the racetrack in the tri-oval, forcing Roper to evade, turning him into Grissom's front bumper. The contact caused Roper's #26 Ford to take a sudden hard-right turn, which then caused the truck to slam head-on into the concrete wall of the tri-oval. Roper died the next day as the result of the injuries he sustained from the crash.

In fall of 2012, Gossage added a carnival outside turn two to promote the track's "Wild Asphalt Circus" theme. On September 23, 2013, the track announced that by the 2014 spring Cup race, the world's largest video screen would be added.

In 2014, Texas Motor Speedway did not sell tickets on the backstretch for either of its NASCAR Cup Series races, reducing the seating capacity of the track to 112,552. The world's largest high-definition video screen at a motor speedway, Big Hoss, was introduced in the Duck Commander 500.

In 2017 along with a repaving of the track surface, the Track was reprofiled to have the banking in turns 1 and 2 be reduced from 24 degrees to 20 degrees along with having the racing surface width expand from 60 feet to 80 feet in turns 1 and 2 as well. 

As a consequence of the COVID-19 pandemic in Texas, TMS held graduations for 23 area high schools in late spring 2020.

With the reveal of the 2021 NASCAR Cup Series schedule, Texas Motor Speedway began hosting the NASCAR All-Star Race while losing the spring Cup date with the addition of the Circuit of the Americas in Austin.

Firestone Firehawk 600

The Firestone Firehawk 600, a CART race, was to be held on April 29, 2001. During practice and qualifying, however, 21 of 25 drivers complained of dizziness and disorientation during two days of practice. Drivers experienced sustained G forces over 5 g, more than the typical human tolerance. With their powerful 900+ hp turbocharged engines and superspeedway downforce packages, the Champ Cars were averaging speeds well in excess of 230 mph. This was much faster than IRL machinery of the time, and faster still than the speeds seen regularly by NASCAR Cup Series cars.

With the possibility of drivers blacking out on the track, CART cancelled the race two hours before the scheduled start.

Statistics

Track records
This length was used by IRL in their races in 1997 and 1998, too. In 2017, IndyCar use a track length of 1.44 miles for timing and scoring.

Lap Records 
The official race lap records at Texas Motor Speedway are listed as:

NASCAR Cup Series

Records
(As of 6/9/2021)

* from minimum 3 starts.

NASCAR Cup Series winners

Notes
2002, 2010 (spring), & 2014 (spring): Race moved from Sunday afternoon to Monday afternoon due to rain.
2006 (fall), 2008 (spring), 2012 (spring), 2014 (both), 2018 (fall) & 2022 (spring): Race extended due to a NASCAR Overtime finish. 2014 (fall) took two attempts.
2011 (spring): First scheduled night event in Cup Series history at Texas Motor Speedway.
2016 (spring): Race was delayed by rain for 2 hours. Race was completed early Sunday morning at 2:45 am CT.
2016 (fall): Race shortened due to rain.
2020 (spring): Race was moved back by several months as a result of the COVID-19 pandemic.
2021–2022 (spring): Were the NASCAR All-Star Race.

IndyCar Series winners

1997: Billy Boat took checkered flag as the winner due to scoring error; Luyendyk declared official winner the following day.
2000 and 2016: Postponed from Saturday night to Sunday afternoon due to rain. 2016 race further postponed due to more rain/logistical issues.
2001: Postponed from September 16 due to 9/11.
2003: Race shortened due to crash involving Kenny Bräck.

Current races hosted

IndyCar Series – Xpel 375
NASCAR Cup Series – NASCAR All-Star Race
NASCAR Cup Series – Autotrader EchoPark Automotive 500
NASCAR Xfinity Series – Alsco Uniforms 250
NASCAR Xfinity Series – Andy's Frozen Custard 335
NASCAR Camping World Truck Series – SpeedyCash.com 220

Other races such as the Lone Star Legends series take place during the summer. The dirt track facility hosts the occasional Monster Truck show as well as motocross and short course racing.

Other events
On June 14, 1997 Texas Motor Speedway hosted the Fruit of the Loom CountryFest for an estimated 185,000 spectators. Featured performers were Jo Dee Messina, Bryan White, Wynonna Judd, Vince Gill, The Charlie Daniels Band, Hank Williams Jr., LeAnn Rimes, Travis Tritt, and Randy Travis.

On June 21, 1997 Texas Motor Speedway hosted the Blockbuster Rock Fest where an estimated 385,000 fans bought tickets and attended. The 15 hour plus and 16 band concert featured the likes of Bush, No Doubt, Collective Soul, Matchbox Twenty, Jewel, the Wallflowers, the Counting Crows, Third Eye Blind, Sugar Ray, Paula Cole as well as many others. Because fans started arriving the night before, VH1 organized a kickoff concert on that Friday night. The concert remains one of the top attended concerts ever.

Ongoing classes and events are held regularly at the facility, such as the Texas Driving Experience and Team Texas.

The Traxxas TORC Series held the series' first off-road racing event in 2009 at Texas Motor Speedway. The 0.4 mile clay oval at the facility was transformed by adding jumps and whoops. Winners in the two-race weekend were: Pro-4 winner Rick Huseman won twice; Pro-2 events were claimed by Ricky Johnson and Scott Taylor; and for Pro Lite class winners were Marty Hart and Casey Currie. It was the only TORC event held at the track as of 2013.

In June 2017, the track hosted the Stadium Super Trucks as a support event for IndyCar. The series raced on a dirt track consisting of the infield, pit road, and the frontstretch. To promote the event, the speedway's turn two featured an off-road expo nicknamed the "Off-Road Ruckus", allowing visitors to drive their off-road vehicles along an obstacle course and observe exhibits.

The first annual Christian alt-rock festival FortyFest was held at the Texas Motor Speedway "Little Texas" facility in August 2010.

Texas Motor Speedway made an unsuccessful overture to move the annual Texas-Oklahoma rivalry football game from the Cotton Bowl to the infield of the modern racing facility in 2004.

See also

 List of NASCAR race tracks
 Sports in Texas

References

External links

Texas Motor Speedway Official Site
RacingCircuits.info's history of Texas Motor Speedway

Trackpedia guide to driving Texas Motor Speedway
Texas Motor Speedway Page on NASCAR.com
GNEXTINC.com: Texas Motor Speedway Page – Local area information, track specs, mapping, news and more.
Jayski's Texas Motor Speedway Page – Current and Past Texas Motor Speedway News
Texas Motor Speedway Fan Page – Photographs and articles on past speedway events.
Dale Jarrett Racing Experience at Texas Motor Speedway
High Resolution image from Google Maps

 
American Le Mans Series circuits
Buildings and structures in Denton County, Texas
Champ Car circuits
IndyCar Series tracks
International Race of Champions tracks
Motorsport venues in Texas
NASCAR tracks
Off-road racing venues in the United States
Sports venues in Fort Worth, Texas
1996 establishments in Texas
Sports venues completed in 1996